Ramsey is a Turkish men's clothing manufacturing and retail business, owned by Remzi Gür and founded by him in London in the 1970s, and now with 155 retail stores in 26 countries.

History
Ramsey is owned by Remzi Gür, and was founded by him in London in the 1970s, and has factories in Turkey and shops from Dublin to Almaty.

In 2012, Ramsey signed a three-year clothing sponsorship deal with the British football team Liverpool FC.

As of December 2015, Ramsey has 155 retail stores in 26 countries.

References

Clothing brands of Turkey
Textile companies of Turkey